Chen Jingwen (born 4 February 1990 in Guangzhou) is a Chinese sprinter who specializes in the 400 metres.

She represented her country in the 4x400 metres relay event at the 2008 Summer Olympics but finished last in the heats. She went on to have a run of success in Asian competitions in 2009: she won the 400 m bronze and relay gold at the 11th Chinese National Games, won individual gold at the 2009 Asian Indoor Games, took a relay gold at the 2009 Asian Athletics Championships and beat compatriot Tang Xiaoyin to the gold medal at the 2009 East Asian Games.

Her personal best time is 52.18 seconds, achieved in November 2006 in Foshan. In the 200 metres she has 23.91 seconds, achieved in the same time and place.

References
 
 Team China 2008

1990 births
Living people
Chinese female sprinters
Athletes (track and field) at the 2008 Summer Olympics
Olympic athletes of China
Asian Games medalists in athletics (track and field)
Athletes from Guangzhou
Athletes (track and field) at the 2010 Asian Games
Athletes (track and field) at the 2014 Asian Games
Asian Games bronze medalists for China
Medalists at the 2010 Asian Games
Medalists at the 2014 Asian Games
Runners from Guangdong
Olympic female sprinters